My Boy Jack is a 2007 British biographical television film based on David Haig's 1997 play of the same name for ITV. It was filmed in August 2007, with Haig as Rudyard Kipling and Daniel Radcliffe as John Kipling. The American television premiere was on 20 April 2008 on PBS, with primetime rebroadcast on 27 March 2011. The film attracted about 5.7 million viewers on its original ITV broadcast in the UK on Remembrance Day, 11 November 2007.

Background

My Boy Jack is based on the 1997 play by English actor David Haig. It tells the story of Rudyard Kipling and his grief for his son, John, who died in the First World War. The title comes from Kipling's poem of the same name.

The theatre piece played at the Theatre Royal, Nottingham, in 2004.  It then toured Oxford, Richmond, Brighton, Norwich, Cardiff and Cambridge, with the newly formed Haig Lang Productions.  In America, My Boy Jack has been performed under the title My Son Jack.

Plot 
As the Great War (World War I) begins, 17-year-old Jack Kipling (Daniel Radcliffe), the only son of the famous English writer and poet Rudyard Kipling, declares his intention to join the Royal Navy to fight against the Germans. The elder Kipling (Haig), who encourages him in his ambition, arranges several appointments for him to enlist in both the Army and Navy. However, when Jack's poor eyesight prevents him from passing the medical examinations, both he and his father are devastated. Determined, Rudyard uses his influence with the military establishment to eventually secure Jack an officer's commission as a Second Lieutenant in the Irish Guards.

Jack's mother, Carrie (Cattrall), and his sister, Elsie (Carey Mulligan), disapprove of this post, as they do not wish for him to go to the war. Jack, who proves to be a popular officer with his troops, undergoes military training and travels to France within six months. On his 18th birthday, Jack receives orders to lead his platoon into action on the following morning. During the Battle of Loos, Jack is posted missing in action and the Kipling family is informed by telegram. For three years, Jack's parents track down and interview surviving members of his platoon. One eventually confirms that Jack was killed in the Battle of Loos, shot by enemy gunfire, after losing his glasses in the mud during an assault on a German machine-gun post.

Cast  
 David Haig as Rudyard Kipling
 Daniel Radcliffe as John Kipling
 Kim Cattrall as Caroline Kipling
 Carey Mulligan as Elsie "Bird" Kipling
 Martin McCann as Bowe
 Julian Wadham as King George V
 Richard Dormer as Corporal O'Leary
 Ruaidhri Conroy as Guardsman McHugh
 Laurence Kinlan as Guardsman Doyle
 Nick Dunning as Colonel Ferguson
 Bill Milner as Peter Carter
 Peter Hanly as Major Sparks
 Fred Ridgeway as Mr Frankland 
Lucy Miller as Mrs Carter
 Michael McElhatton as Leo Amery MP		
Peter Gowen as H. A. Gwynne
Michael Grennel as Commander Egan	
Ciaran Nolan as Daly	
Sean O'Neil as Mr Relph
 Bosco Hogan as Colonel Brooks	
Adam Goodwin as Captain Bruce
 Peter O'Meara as Captain Viney
John-Paul MacLeod as Ralph
David Heap as Colonel Hayden		
Billy Gibson as Maitland		
 Robbie Kay as Authur Relph
 Fred Ridgeway as Hobdon		
 Chris McHallem as Mr Lieuenthal
 Jason Maza as Journalist

Filming
Filmed on location in Counties Laois and Kildare, Ireland with one scene in the Olympia Theatre, Dublin. Exterior scenes for  film were shot at Bateman's, the 17th-century house that was Kipling's home from 1902 to his death in 1936, which is now a National Trust property.

Reviews 
Reviews of the film were generally positive. The aggregate Metacritic score was 78/100, with positive reviews from Entertainment Weekly, the Boston Globe, Variety, the Orlando Sentinel, the New York Post, The Hollywood Reporter, the Los Angeles Times, the San Francisco Chronicle and the Chicago Tribune, and with more negative reviews from Philadelphia Daily News, The New York Times and The Wall Street Journal. Several reviews took note of Daniel Radcliffe's starring role as Jack. Both Radcliffe and Haig were generally well-received, though Kim Cattrall received mixed reviews for her performance as Jack's mother.

Awards
It won Silver Magnolia Award for Best Television Film at the 14th Shanghai Television Festival in China.

References

External links 
 Masterpiece Theatre website
 

2007 television films
2007 films
British biographical films
British television films
British war films
Films about Nobel laureates
British films based on plays
Films set in Sussex
Films shot in Dublin (city)
Films shot in East Sussex
Rudyard Kipling
Cultural depictions of George V
Western Front (World War I) films
World War I films based on actual events
World War I television films
Films directed by Brian Kirk
2000s British films